The Oblivion Particle is the twelfth studio album by American progressive rock band Spock's Beard. It was released on August 21, 2015. It was the last album with drummer Jimmy Keegan, who left the band in October 2016 for personal reasons. This album also features Nick D'Virgilio on one track as a guest musician. Only 3 songs on the album feature writing credits to the band members themselves, with the rest being credited to longtime collaborators Stan Ausmus and John Boegehold.

Track listing

Personnel

Spock's Beard
Ted Leonard - lead vocals, guitars, additional tracks and overdubs recording
Alan Morse - electric guitar, acoustic guitar, pedal steel guitar, lap steel guitar, mandolin, autoharp, backing vocals, producing, additional tracks and overdubs recording
Ryo Okumoto - organ, mellotron, piano, synths, clavinet, vocoder, additional tracks and overdubs recording
Dave Meros - bass, backing vocals, lead vocals on "Iron Man", additional tracks and overdubs recording
Jimmy Keegan - drums/percussion, timpani, backing vocals, lead vocals on "Bennett Built a Time Machine"

Additional musicians
David Ragsdale - violin on "Disappear"
Nick D'Virgilio - drums on "Iron Man"

Production
John Boegehold - concept, producing, Candid Studio photos
Rich Mouser - producing, engineering, mixing, mastering
Jeff Fox - second engineering
Jeff Silverman - Alan's studio engineering
John Morse - Alan's studio engineering
Jimmy Branly - Jimmy's percussion engineering

Additional personnel
Thomas Ewerhard - cover artwork, graphic design
Alex Solca - band photography
Stan Ausmus - Candid Studio photos

Charts

References

2015 albums
Spock's Beard albums
Inside Out Music albums